The 18th (Eastern) Division was an infantry division of the British Army formed in September 1914 during the First World War as part of the K2 Army Group, part of Lord Kitchener's New Armies. From its creation the division trained in England until 25 May 1915 when it landed in France and spent the duration of the First World War in action on the Western Front, becoming one of the elite divisions of the British Army. During the Battle of the Somme in the latter half of 1916, the 18th Division was commanded by Major General Ivor Maxse.

Formation history 
The division was formed in September 1914 during the First World War as part of the K2 Army Group, part of Lord Kitchener's New Armies. It was formed in the Colchester area but re-located to Salisbury Plain in May 1915. Major-General Ivor Maxse took command in October 1914.

Order of battle
The following units served in the division.
 53rd Brigade 
 10th (Service) Battalion, Essex Regiment
 8th (Service) Battalion, Norfolk Regiment (disbanded February 1918)
 8th (Service) Battalion, Suffolk Regiment (disbanded February 1918)
 6th (Service) Battalion, Princess Charlotte of Wales's (Royal Berkshire Regiment) (disbanded February 1918)
 8th (Service) Battalion, Princess Charlotte of Wales's (Royal Berkshire Regiment) (joined February 1918)
 7th (Service) Battalion, Queen's Own (Royal West Kent Regiment) (joined from 55th Brigade February 1918)
53rd Machine Gun Company (joined 13 February 1916, left to move into 18th MG Battalion 16 February 1918)
53rd Trench Mortar Battery (joined 17 June 1916)

 54th Brigade 
10th (Service) Battalion, Royal Fusiliers (left October 1914)
 11th (Service) Battalion, Royal Fusiliers
 6th (Service) Battalion, Northamptonshire Regiment (joined November 1914)
 12th (Service) Battalion, Duke of Cambridge's Own (Middlesex Regiment) (disbanded February 1918)
 8th (Service) Battalion, Royal Sussex Regiment (reformed as divisional pioneers February 1915)
 7th (Service) Battalion, Bedfordshire Regiment (joined February 1915 merged with 2nd Battalion in May 1918)
 2nd Battalion, Bedfordshire Regiment (joined May 1918)
54th Machine Gun Company (joined 13 February 1916, left to move into 18th MG Battalion 16 February 1918)
54th Trench Mortar Battery (joined 1 June 1916)

 55th Brigade 
 7th (Service) Battalion, Queen's (Royal West Surrey Regiment)
 7th (Service) Battalion, Buffs (East Kent Regiment)
 8th (Service) Battalion, East Surrey Regiment
 7th (Service) Battalion, Queen's Own (Royal West Kent Regiment) (transferred to 53rd Brigade February 1918)
55th Machine Gun Company (joined 13 February 1916, left to move into 18th MG Battalion 16 February 1918)
55th Trench Mortar Battery (joined 17 June 1916)

Divisional Troops
6th (Service) Battalion, Northamptonshire Regiment (left November 1914)
10th (Service) Battalion, Royal Fusiliers (joined October 1914, left March 1915)
8th (Service) Battalion, Royal Sussex Regiment (joined as Pioneer Battalion in February 1915 from 54th Brigade)
15th Motor Machine Gun Battery (joined 22 July 1915, left 4 May 1916)
18th Battalion Machine Gun Corps (M.G.C.) (formed 16 February 1918 absorbing brigade MG companies)
Divisional Mounted Troops	
C Sqn, Westmorland and Cumberland Yeomanry (joined 15 June 1915, left 10 May 1916)
18th Divisional Cyclist Company, Army Cyclist Corps (formed 8 December 1914, left 21 May 1916)
18th Divisional Train Army Service Corps
150th, 151st, 152nd and 153rd Companies
30th Mobile Veterinary Section Army Veterinary Corps
219th Divisional Employment Company (joined 3 June 1917)

Royal Artillery
LXXXII Brigade, Royal Field Artillery (R.F.A.)
LXXXIII Brigade, R.F.A.
LXXXIV Brigade, R.F.A. (left 25 January 1917)
LXXXV (Howitzer) Brigade, R.F.A. (broken up 3 December 1916)
18th Divisional Ammunition Column R.F.A.
18th Heavy Battery, Royal Garrison Artillery (raised with the Division but moved independently to Egypt in October 1915)
V.18 and W. 18 Heavy Trench Mortar Batteries R.F.A. (V battery formed 28 April 1916, left for II Corps on 19 February 1918. W battery formed 21 May 1916, but broken up by 26 November 1916)
X.18, Y.18 and Z.18 Medium Mortar Batteries R.F.A. (formed 19 June 1916, Z battery broken up 19 February 1918 and distributed to X and Y batteries)

Royal Engineers
79th Field Company
80th Field Company
92nd Field Company
18th Divisional Signals Company

Royal Army Medical Corps
54th Field Ambulance
55th Field Ambulance
56th Field Ambulance
35th Sanitary Section (left 24 March 1917)

Battles 

Battle of the Somme (1916)
Battle of Albert
Capture of Trônes Wood: 14–15 July 1916.
Battle of Delville Wood
Battle of Thiepval Ridge
Battle of the Ancre Heights
Battle of the Ancre
Third Battle of Ypres
Battle of Épehy

Commanders

Footnotes

See also

List of British divisions in World War I
Alan Brooke, 1st Viscount Alanbrooke, who served with this division from 1916−1917 and ultimately rose to become Chief of the Imperial General Staff (CIGS) during the Second World War

References

External links 
The British Army in the Great War: The 18th (Eastern) Division

Further reading

Infantry divisions of the British Army in World War I
Kitchener's Army divisions
Military units and formations established in 1914
Military units and formations disestablished in 1919
1914 establishments in the United Kingdom